The Landwehr Corps was a corps level command of the German Army in World War I.

Formation 
The Landwehr Corps was formed on the outbreak of war in August 1914 as part of the mobilisation of the Army. It was initially commanded by General der Infanterie Remus von Woyrsch, who had been recalled from retirement. It was still in existence at the end of the war.

Structure on formation 
On formation, in August 1914, the Landwehr Corps consisted of two divisions, which were made up of 3rd line units. The Senior Landwehr Commander 3 was formed with units drawn from V Corps District (Province of Posen and Lower Silesia) and Senior Landwehr Commander 4 was formed with units drawn from VI Corps District (Province of Silesia, particularly Upper Silesia). It mobilised with 34 infantry battalions (considerably above the norm), just four machine gun platoons (eight machine guns), nine cavalry squadrons, four field artillery batteries (24 guns) and two pioneer companies.

Combat chronicle 
On mobilisation, the Landwehr Corps was assigned to the 8th Army on the Eastern Front. Whilst the 8th Army was concentrated in East Prussia, the Landwehr Corps was detached to Upper Silesia. On 4 September 1914, it came under the command of 1st Austro-Hungarian Army. Due to losses suffered by the 4th Landwehr Division in the Battle of Tarnawka (7–9 September 1914), the 11th and 51st Landwehr Infantry Regiments were reduced to a single battalion each; the 22nd and 23rd Landwehr Infantry Regiments were reduced to two battalions each.

On 14 September 1914, the Brigade Ersatz Battalions of the 21st Ersatz Infantry Brigade were dissolved and their manpower used to replace combat losses in the following battalions:
21st Brigade Ersatz Battalion absorbed into II Battalion, 51st Landwehr Infantry Regiment
22nd Brigade Ersatz Battalion absorbed into II Battalion, 11th Landwehr Infantry Regiment
23rd Brigade Ersatz Battalion absorbed into II Battalion, 51st Landwehr Infantry Regiment
24th Brigade Ersatz Battalion absorbed into II Battalion, 11th Landwehr Infantry Regiment
78th Brigade Ersatz Battalion absorbed into II Battalion, 78th Landwehr Infantry Regiment

On 25 September 1914, the Brigade Ersatz Battalions of the 17th Ersatz Infantry Brigade were likewise dissolved:
17th Brigade Ersatz Battalion absorbed into III Battalion, 23rd Landwehr Infantry Regiment
18th Brigade Ersatz Battalion absorbed into III Battalion, 51st Landwehr Infantry Regiment
19th Brigade Ersatz Battalion absorbed into III Battalion, 22nd Landwehr Infantry Regiment
20th Brigade Ersatz Battalion absorbed into III Battalion, 22nd Landwehr Infantry Regiment
77th Brigade Ersatz Battalion absorbed into III Battalion, 11th Landwehr Infantry Regiment

The Landwehr Corps joined the 9th Army on 24 September 1914.

Commanders 
The Landwehr Corps had the following commanders during its existence:

From 3 November 1914, von Woyrsch was assigned to concurrently command Armee-Abteilung Woyrsch. A deputy, Generalleutnant Götz Freiherr von König, took command of the Landwehr Corps on 3 December 1914.

See also 

German Army order of battle (1914)
Imperial-Royal Landwehr

References

Bibliography 
 
 
 
 
 
 

Corps of Germany in World War I
Military units and formations established in 1914
Military units and formations disestablished in 1918